Elovdol Glacier is the 8 km long and 3 km wide glacier in Arkovna Ridge, Aristotle Mountains on Oscar II Coast in Graham Land.  It flows 6 km eastwards, then turns southeast to join Mapple Glacier.  The feature is named after the settlements of Elovdol in Western Bulgaria.

Location
British mapping in 1976.

Maps

 British Antarctic Territory.  Scale 1:200000 topographic map.  DOS 610 Series, Sheet W 65 62.  Directorate of Overseas Surveys, Tolworth, UK, 1976.
 Antarctic Digital Database (ADD). Scale 1:250000 topographic map of Antarctica. Scientific Committee on Antarctic Research (SCAR). Since 1993, regularly upgraded and updated.

References
 Elovdol Glacier. SCAR Composite Antarctic Gazetteer.
 Bulgarian Antarctic Gazetteer. Antarctic Place-names Commission. (details in Bulgarian, basic data in English)

External links
 Elovdol Glacier. Copernix satellite image

Glaciers of Oscar II Coast
Bulgaria and the Antarctic